The Legal Tender Modernization Act was a bill proposed by United States Representative Jim Kolbe of Arizona in 2002. Its main goal was to stop the continual production of pennies. The bill also mentions other provisions including:
 Allows the Bureau of Engraving and Printing to print postage stamps, currency, and security documents for foreign governments and U.S. states or political subdivisions in order to make foreign currency consistent with U.S. foreign policy.
 Five different new designs each year for the $2 Federal reserve notes.
 Prohibits redesigning the $1 Federal Reserve Note, as it is not as inclined into being counterfeited therefore there is no need of a redesign.
 States that the seigniorage (the U.S. government's profit earned from selling money to the Federal Reserve) should be included in the budget as a receipt.

The bill failed to advance in the house and died when the 107th Congress adjourned.

Criticism
Critics of the Legal Tender Modernization Act state that by eliminating the penny, the rounding system would increase prices that could hurt the consumer, especially the lower class. Kolbe however has responded to such criticism and has stated that the rounding system "favors neither the consumer nor the retailer because the probability of rounding up or down is 50 percent either way – it would all come out even in the end."

Other common criticisms include charitable causes depending on the penny, its perceived historical importance, and the adverse effect on the zinc industry as a penny is 97.5% zinc.

See also

 Penny (United States coin)
 Penny debate in the United States

References

External links
 House Republican Conference
 CNN: Should the Penny Go?
 CNN: The Fight Against the Penny
 Citizens for Retiring the Penny
 USA Today: Coins cost more to make than face value

Coins of the United States
Proposed legislation of the 107th United States Congress